Guido Rodríguez (born 12 April 1994) is an Argentine professional footballer who plays as a defensive midfielder for La Liga club Real Betis and the Argentina national team.

Club career
Rodríguez began his career with River Plate, whom he debuted for in 2014. He stayed with the club until 2016. He struggled for playing time, only managing to appear in sixteen league matches and twice in the Copa Argentina. Rodríguez also spent time on loan with Defensa y Justicia in 2016, managing fifteen league appearances.

In the summer of 2016, Rodríguez joined Mexican side Club Tijuana. He made 39 league appearances and scored five goals.

On 7 July 2017, Rodríguez joined Club América in a reported $7 million deal, reuniting with former Tijuana manager Miguel Herrera.

International career
On 9 June 2017, Rodríguez earned his first call-up with the Argentina national team for the friendly match against Brazil in Melbourne. He came on as a substitute for Paulo Dybala in Argentina’s 1–0 win.

In May 2019, Rodríguez was included in Argentina's 23-man squad for the 2019 Copa América.

He scored his first international goal in Argentina's second group match of the 2021 Copa América on 18 June 2021, the only goal in a 1–0 victory against Uruguay.

In 11 November 2022, Rodríguez was included in Argentina's 26-man squad for the 2022 FIFA World Cup.

Career statistics

Club

International

Scores and results list Argentina's goal tally first, score column indicates score after each Rodríguez goal.

Honours
River Plate
Copa Sudamericana: 2014

América
Liga MX: Apertura 2018
Copa MX: Clausura 2019

Betis
Copa del Rey: 2021–22

Argentina
FIFA World Cup: 2022
Copa América: 2021
CONMEBOL–UEFA Cup of Champions: 2022

Individual
Liga MX Defensive Midfielder of the Year: 2016-17, 2018–19
Liga MX Balón de Oro: 2018–19

References

External links

 Profile at the Real Betis website
 

1994 births
Living people
Sportspeople from Buenos Aires Province
Argentine footballers
Association football midfielders
Argentine Primera División players
Club Atlético River Plate footballers
Defensa y Justicia footballers
Liga MX players
Club Tijuana footballers
Club América footballers
La Liga players
Real Betis players
Argentine expatriate footballers
Argentine expatriate sportspeople in Mexico
Argentine expatriate sportspeople in Spain
Expatriate footballers in Mexico
Expatriate footballers in Spain
Argentina international footballers
2019 Copa América players
2021 Copa América players
2022 FIFA World Cup players
Copa América-winning players
FIFA World Cup-winning players